Karin Elisabet Lindberg (later Lindén, 6 October 1929 – 2 December 2020) was a Swedish gymnast. She competed at the 1948, 1952 and 1956 Summer Olympics and won a gold and a silver medal in team exercise with portable apparatus, in 1952 and 1956, respectively. Her teams finished fourth all-around in 1948 and 1952. At the 1948 Summer Olympics, she had the highest score in the entire competition on vault in both the compulsory and optional segments of the competition. She continued to be good on this apparatus for years to come as evidenced by the fact that she took seventh place on the vault in 1952.

References

Further reading

External links
 

1929 births
2020 deaths
Swedish female artistic gymnasts
Olympic gymnasts of Sweden
Olympic gold medalists for Sweden
Olympic silver medalists for Sweden
Olympic medalists in gymnastics
Gymnasts at the 1948 Summer Olympics
Gymnasts at the 1952 Summer Olympics
Gymnasts at the 1956 Summer Olympics
Medalists at the 1952 Summer Olympics
Medalists at the 1956 Summer Olympics
Medalists at the World Artistic Gymnastics Championships
People from Kalix Municipality
Sportspeople from Norrbotten County
20th-century Swedish women